The 1994 Fresno State Bulldogs football team represented California State University, Fresno as a member of the Western Athletic Conference (WAC) during the 1994 NCAA Division I-A football season. Led by 17th-year head coach Jim Sweeney, Fresno State compiled an overall record of 5–7–1 with a mark of 3–4–1 in conference play, placing seventh in the WAC. The Bulldogs played their home games at Bulldog Stadium in Fresno, California.

Schedule

Team players in the NFL
The following were selected in the 1995 NFL Draft.

The following finished their college career in 1994, were not drafted, but played in the NFL.

References

Fresno State
Fresno State Bulldogs football seasons
Fresno State Bulldogs football